Barazani is a Baloch tribe living in Iranian Balochistan.

See also
 Baluch
 Baloch tribes
 Baluchistan
 Barzani (disambiguation)

Sources
 Countrystudies.us: Iran - Baluchis
MNSU,edu: Baluchi

Baloch tribes
Ethnic groups in Iran
Sistan and Baluchestan Province